Highway Song may refer to:

"Highway Song (James Taylor song)" from James Taylor's 1971 album Mudslide Slim and the Blue Horizon
"Highway Song", a song by the hard rock band Blackfoot, from their album, Strikes
"Highway Song", a song by Krokus from To You All
"Highway Song", a song by System of a Down from Steal This Album!
"Highway Song", a song by Hot Tuna from Burgers (album)